The Taiwan Nationalist Party (TNP) was a political party officially registered on 27 May 2007, being the 127th legal political party in Taiwan. The party was founded in July 2005 by activists supportive of Taiwanese independence. It has been dissolved by the Ministry of the Interior.

History 
Kan Nai-ti (甘乃迪) became the first chairperson of the Taiwan Nationalist Party on 30 July 2005 in Taoyuan. Lacking in preparations, it was not legalised until 27 May 2015. Before registration, there was a suggestion to change the name to distinguish from the Kuomintang (Chinese Nationalist Party) from the Ministry of the Interior.

The Taiwan Nationalist Party stated it was centrist and supported Taiwanese nationalism.

On 29 April 2020, the Taiwan Nationalist Party was dissolved by the Ministry of the Interior for not obeying the Political Parties Act.

References 

Political parties disestablished in 2020
2020 disestablishments in Taiwan
Political parties established in 2007
Defunct political parties in Taiwan
Pro-independence parties